iVideosongs, owned by Songmaster Studios Education LLC, is an online music instruction service where original artists show how to play the songs they have written and performed. The site also has song instruction from studio musicians and from professional music instructors. The company slogan is "We'll show you how to play complete songs accurately."

Overview 
iVideosongs lets users choose a skill level and genre, then download the high-definition video to their personal computer, iPod, iPad or other device. Each song title is presented in chapter format, so users learn the introduction, verse, chorus, bridge, outro and other elements. Each title includes a master performance, so participants can compare their progress against the song, and tablature notation to aid in learning.

For its iVideosongs products, Songmaster has licensed full rights to songs from BMG Music Publishing, EMI Music Publishing, Sony/ATV Music Publishing, Universal Music Publishing Group, Warner/Chappell Music as well as dozens of secondary and tertiary publishers, and pays royalties to stakeholders. This allows the company to provide complete and accurate instructional titles, presented exactly as they were originally written and performed, such as a lesson with Rush guitarist Alex Lifeson teaching students to play the song "Tom Sawyer". The iVideosongs titles are primarily for electric and acoustic guitarists, but titles for bass, keyboards and drums are also included in the catalog.

The Songmaster Websites have free tutorials to help beginning musicians develop proficiency in techniques such as slide guitar, playing chordal fills and walking bass lines. Beginning tutorials are also offered as a podcast through iTunes.

History 
iVideosongs was first launched on January 29, 2008 at the DEMO 08 conference in Palm Desert, California. Later that year, iVideosongs became one of the top 10 most subscribed podcasts on iTunes. iVideosongs got its start in Atlanta, GA, co-founded by Andy Morton and Grammy-nominated musician Tim Huffman.

iVideosongs was acquired by Songmaster Studios Education LLC in 2011. Based in Jupiter, Florida, Songmaster Studios produces and distributes a catalog of about 230 iVideosongs titles from its websites and through Apple's iTunes, Viacom's Rockband, Amazon, Alfred Publishing and other partners.

Featured artists 
Songmaster's featured artists include:
Pierre Bensusan
Jeff Carlisi
D.J. Fontana
Jon Foreman
Russ Kunkel
Sharon Isbin
Chuck Leavell
Mark Lee
Alex Lifeson
John McEuen
Jim Messina
Scotty Moore
Graham Nash
Ryan Newell
John Oates
Kim Richey

Instructors
iVideosongs instructors include:
Danny Grady
Steve Rieck
Rob Schumann
Alex Winfield

References 

 What Would You Do if I Showed You the Chords..., Crawdaddy!
 So you want to be a real guitar hero? , DEMO conference
 Using the Internet to Improve Your Playing, Guitar Noize
 Join the Beatles on Web video, Reuters
 Guitar playing startup hopes to cash in on instructional videos, VentureBeat
 Learn to Play Exactly Like the Beatles, AppScout
 iVideosongs Debuts - Learn How To Play RUSH's 'Tom Sawyer', Brave Words & Bloody Knuckles
 iVideoSongs.com - Giles Will Show You, KillerStartups
 Demo conference intrigues, but doesn't electrify, USA Today
 Pay Graham Nash to teach you guitar, CNET News
 Guitar Lessons from the Stars, in HD , Yahoo! Tech
 Tech Startups Rock DEMO Conference, Popular Science

External links 
Official site of new operating company, Songmaster Studios Education LLC [Sept. 2010]
Official site
iVideosongs MySpace Page

Musical training software